Gábor Mádi Szabó (1922–2003) was a Hungarian actor.

Selected filmography
 Mrs. Szabó (1949)
 The Sea Has Risen (1953)
 Two Confessions (1957)
 The Smugglers (1958)
 St. Peter's Umbrella (1958)
 I'll Go to the Minister (1962)
 Stars of Eger (1968)

External links

1922 births
2003 deaths
Hungarian male film actors
Hungarian male stage actors
Hungarian male television actors